"She's a Bitch" is a song recorded by American rapper Missy "Misdemeanor" Elliott for her second album, Da Real World (1999). Produced by Timbaland, it was released as the album's debut single, and despite an expensive music video directed by video director Hype Williams, the song peaked only at number 90 on the U.S. Billboard Hot 100, with Da Real World's other singles "All n My Grill" and "Hot Boyz" going on to greater chart success. Elliott performed the song live on a number of occasions, including the 2017 VH1 Hip Hop Honors: The '90s Game Changers.

In 2017, rapper Ski Mask the Slump God released a remix of the song titled "Catch Me Outside".

Music video
The "She's a Bitch" video was directed by Hype Williams on May 1, 1999; similar to his other clips for Elliott, Williams makes extensive use of unique effects, costuming, and sets. Highlights of the video include Elliott and her dancers being raised from underwater on a giant hydraulic "M", and also a complete set made from electroluminescent lighting.

Track listings

UK single
12-inch promo

Side A
"She's a Bitch" (Radio Edit) – 3:27
"She's a Bitch" (Clean Version) – 3:27
Side B
"She's a Bitch" (Instrumental) – 4:00
"She's a Bitch" (Acapella) – 3:48

US single
12-inch promo

Side A
"She's a Bitch" (Radio Edit) – 3:27
"She's a Bitch" (Clean Version) – 3:27
Side B
"She's a Bitch" (Instrumental) – 4:00
"She's a Bitch" (Acapella) – 3:48

CD promo
"She's a Bitch" (Radio Edit) – 3:27
"She's a Bitch" (Clean Version) – 3:27
"Audio Bio" – 1:25

Europe single
CD promo
"She's a Bitch" (Radio Edit) – 3:27
"She's a Bitch" (Clean Version) – 3:27

Personnel
All vocals by Missy "Misdemeanor" Elliott and Timbaland
Produced by Timbaland
Co-produced by Missy "Misdemeanor" Elliott
Engineer: Senator Jimmy D (Jimmy Douglass)
Assistant engineer: Drew Coleman
Mixed by Timbaland and Jimmy Douglass at Manhattan Center Studios, New York, New York.
Assistant mixing engineer: Darren S. Moore

Charts

References

1999 singles
Missy Elliott songs
Music videos directed by Hype Williams
Song recordings produced by Timbaland
Songs written by Missy Elliott
Songs written by Timbaland
1998 songs
Elektra Records singles